Ex aequo et bono (Latin for "according to the right and good" or "from equity and conscience") is a Latin phrase that is used as a legal term of art. In the context of arbitration, it refers to the power of arbitrators to dispense with consideration of the law but consider solely what they consider to be fair and equitable in the case at hand. However, a decision ex aequo et bono is distinguished from a decision on the basis of equity (equity intra legem), "Whereas an authorisation to decide a question ex aequo et bono is an authorisation to decide without deference to the rules of law, an authorisation to decide on a basis of equity does not dispense the judge from giving a decision based upon law, even though the law be modified".

Article 38(2) of the Statute of the International Court of Justice (ICJ) provides that the court may decide cases ex aequo et bono only if the parties agree. In 1984, the ICJ decided a case using "equitable criteria" in creating a boundary in the Gulf of Maine for Canada and the US. This was not, however, in relation to Art. 38(2) which has never been invoked by the parties in a dispute before the ICJ. It was an example of referring to 'equity' as a general principle of law under Art. 38 (1) (c).

Article 33 of the United Nations Commission on International Trade Law's Arbitration Rules (1976) provides that the arbitrators shall consider only the applicable law unless the arbitral agreement allows the arbitrators to consider ex aequo et bono, or amiable compositeur, instead. This rule is also expressed in many national and subnational arbitration laws such as section 22 of the Commercial Arbitration Act 1984 (NSW). It is also embodied under Section 28(2) of the Indian arbitration law - Arbitration & Conciliation Act, 1996 ("The arbitral tribunal shall decide ex aequo et bono or as amicable compositeur only if the parties have expressly authorised it to do so")

On the other hand, the constituent treaty of the Eritrea–Ethiopia Claims Commission explicitly forbids the body from interpreting ex aequo et bono.

Ex aequo
The phrase ex aequo (without et bono) is used to mean "equally placed", often in the context of competition winners.

See also
Equity (law) – similar concept in common law jurisdictions
Ius strictum – opposite concept in Roman law
Lex mercatoria

Notes

Further reading
 John Bouvier, A law dictionary, Philadelphia,  Childs & Peterson, 1858
 Josephine K. Mason, The Role of Ex Aequo et Bono in International Border Settlement: A Critique of the Sudanese Abyei Arbitration, Social Science Research Network, 2010; 20 Am. Rev. Int'l Arb. 519 (2009).
 Christoph Schreuer, `Decisions Ex Aequo et Bono under the ICSID Convention` (1996)
 Leon Trakman, Ex Aequo et Bono: Demystifying an Ancient Concept, 8 Chi. J. Int'l L. 621 (2008).

Latin legal terminology
Restitution
Arbitration